The Seamstress is a 2009 Canadian slasher film directed by Jesse James Miller. In the film, a curse from a woman being tortured by a mob awakens a specter. The specter terrorizes a group of friends who arrive on an island to search for the missing father of the group's leader.

Reception
Dread Central gave the film a mixed review, saying that while it's "a great looking low budget horror movie", it "was a 75-minute movie where very little happened until the film is already halfway over and what did happen wasn't worth the wait." HorrorNews.net's Craig McGee's review said that the film "wasn't horrible" and "had the potential, but for one reason or another never came close to living up to that potential."

References

External links

2009 films
Canadian supernatural horror films
Canadian slasher films
English-language Canadian films
2000s English-language films
Supernatural slasher films
2000s supernatural horror films
2000s Canadian films